The seedcrackers are the genus Pyrenestes of the estrildid finches family. These birds are found in Sub-Saharan Africa. They are gregarious seed eaters with short, very thick, grey bills. All have crimson on the face and tail.

Species
The members are:

References
Clement, Harris and Davis, Finches and Sparrows  

.